Dulopolis or Doulopolis ( or Δόυλων πόλις) means slaves' city.

Several cities have borne this name:

 A city of ancient Crete, which was mentioned by Sosicrates in the first book of his work on Crete, and was said to have contained a thousand male citizens. However, modern scholars treat Dulopolis as a false toponym.
 A city in ancient Libya.
 One of the ancient names of the modern city of Plovdiv.
 A city of sacred slaves, in which one man is free. Suda does not give any more information regarding this city.
 Dulopolis in Caria.

References

Ancient Crete
Fictional populated places